Coeloplana is a genus of ctenophores, which are marine invertebrates, or comb jellies. Species include:
 Coeloplana agniae Dawydoff, 1930
 Coeloplana anthostella Song & Hwang, 2010
 Coeloplana astericola Mortensen, 1927
 Coeloplana bannwarthii Krumbach, 1933
 Coeloplana bocki Komai, 1920
 Coeloplana duboscqui Dawydoff, 1930
 Coeloplana echinicola Tanaka, 1932
 Coeloplana fishelsoni Alamaru, Brokovich & Loya, 2015
 Coeloplana gonoctena Krempf, 1920
 Coeloplana huchonae Alamaru, Brokovich & Loya, 2015
 Coeloplana indica Devanesen and Varadarajan, 1942
 Coeloplana komaii Utinomi, 1963
 Coeloplana krusadiensis Devanesen and Varadarajan, 1942
 Coeloplana lineolata Fricke, 1970
 Coeloplana loyai Alamaru & Brokovich, 2015
 Coeloplana mellosa Gershwin, Zeidler & Davie, 2010
 Coeloplana mesnili Dawydoff, 1938
 Coeloplana meteoris Thiel, 1968
 Coeloplana metschnikowii Kowalevsky, 1880
 Coeloplana mitsukurii Abbott, 1902
 Coeloplana perrieri Dawydoff, 1930
 Coeloplana punctata Fricke, 1970
 Coeloplana reichelti Gershwin, Zeidler & Davie, 2010
 Coeloplana scaberiae Matsumoto and Gowlett-Holmes, 1996
 Coeloplana sophiae Dawydoff, 1938
 Coeloplana tattersalli Devanesen and Varadarajan, 1942
 Coeloplana thomsoni Matsumoto, 1999
 Coeloplana waltoni Glynn, 2014
 Coeloplana weilli Dawydoff, 1938
 Coeloplana willeyi Abbott, 1902, an epizoite of sea cucumbers 
 Coeloplana wuennenbergi Fricke, 1970
 Coeloplana yulianicorum  Alamaru, Brokovich & Loya, 2015

References

Ctenophore genera